Sphegina (Asiosphegina) cerina is a species of hoverfly in the family Syrphidae found in Kambaiti Pass, Myanmar, a montane forest with swampy areas and streams located 2000 meters above sea level.

Etymology
The name comes from Latin 'cerina', meaning 'wax-coloured or yellowish', referring to the fly's yellowish coloration.

Description
Like other species in its genus, S. (A.) cerina is small, slender, and wasp-like. It bears a slight resemblance to species such as S. (A.) cultrigera, S. (A.) ensifera, S. (A.) siculifera, S. (A.) parvula, S. (A.) sinesmila, S. (A.) minuta, and S. (A.) pusilla, but is easily differentiated by its yellow gena and yellow scutellum, as well as the long S-shaped surstylus and the claw-like, apically tapering superior lobe. In male specimens, the body length is 6.2 millimeters. The wings are 6.0 millimeters long, hyaline with yellowish stigma. The face is yellow and moderately concave with a weakly developed frontal prominence. The antenna are yellow, the basal flagellomere 1.5 times longer than broad, and the arista is yellowish and pilose. The surstyli are nearly symmetrical and the superior lobes are slightly asymmetrical. Females are much the same except for normal sexual dimorphism; body length is 5.9 to 6.8 millimeters and wing length is 5.6 to 6.5 millimeters.

References

Eristalinae
Insects described in 2015
Diptera of Asia